The Pomerene House is the residence of Atlee Pomerene, United States Senator from Ohio in the early 20th century.  President Calvin Coolidge appointed Senator Pomerene as one of two individuals to investigate the Teapot Dome scandal of the Harding Administration.  He was one of the two primary sponsors of the Webb-Pomerene Act of 1918, regulating American investments overseas.  During the 1928 Democratic National Convention, his name was placed before the convention as a potential presidential candidate.

The house was built in 1879 in an Italianate style.  It is rectangular with a brick façade over a wood frame.  The north face is symmetrical with the front door centered under an arched transom.

See also

The NAEWS & Pomerene Lab of the Ohio Agricultural Research and Development Center

References

National Register of Historic Places in Holmes County, Ohio
Queen Anne architecture in Ohio
Houses completed in 1875
Houses in Holmes County, Ohio